Hugo Andersson may refer to:

 Hugo Andersson (1930s footballer), Swedish footballer for Malmö FF
 Hugo Andersson (footballer, born 1999), Swedish footballer for Randers FC